Dolní Paseky (German: Niederreuth) is a village in Karlovy Vary Region, Czech Republic. It is one of the nine town districts of Aš. In 2001 the village had a population of 39.

For most part, the village serves as a recreation area for whole Aš-region. A pavillon with a mineral spring, built in 1930, is located in the village.

Geography 
Dolní Paseky lies 3 kilometres east from Aš, about 545 meters above sea level, and is surrounded by forests. Through village flows Bílý Halštrov river, and close is Bílý Halštrov reservoir.

History 
Dolní Paseky is first time mentioned in 1315, but probably was founded earlier (in the 12th century). First recorded owners were the Nothafft. In the 15th century the village was bought by the Reitzenstein, and later by the Zedtwitz.

The name of the village 
Dolní mean Lower, and Paseky is plural for Paseka, which means Glade or Clearing. The German name, Niederreuth, has the same meaning as the Czech one.

Landmarks 
 Wood-frame houses,
 World War I Memorial from 1931,
 school building from 1839,
 pavilion with a mineral spring.

Gallery

References 

Aš
Villages in Cheb District